Braamfontein Werf is a suburb of Johannesburg, South Africa. It is located in Region F of the City of Johannesburg Metropolitan Municipality. Braamfontein Werf is part of the area known as Milpark, along with small parts of neighboring suburbs like Parktown. 

Johannesburg Region F